István Móna (17 September 1940 – 28 July 2010) was a Hungarian modern pentathlete and Olympic champion. He was born in Nyíregyháza.

Olympics
Móna won a gold medal at the 1968 Summer Olympics in Mexico City with the Hungarian team.

References

1940 births
2010 deaths
Hungarian male modern pentathletes
Olympic modern pentathletes of Hungary
Modern pentathletes at the 1968 Summer Olympics
Olympic gold medalists for Hungary
Olympic medalists in modern pentathlon
World Modern Pentathlon Championships medalists
Medalists at the 1968 Summer Olympics
People from Nyíregyháza
Sportspeople from Szabolcs-Szatmár-Bereg County